Shawnee was a passenger steam turbine-powered ship built in 1926-1927 by Newport News Ship Building & Drydock Co. of Newport News for Clyde Steamship Company, a subsidiary of Atlantic, Gulf & West Indies Steamship Lines (AGWI Lines) with intention of operating between New York and southern ports of the United States. During the World War II the liner was requisitioned by the US Government, and served as the United States Army Transport from September 1942 to March 1946 in the Atlantic, Mediterranean and Pacific. Following the end of the war, the ship was sold to a Portuguese company and renamed City of Lisbon, and subsequently resold to Yugoslavia, becoming Partizanka operating with the shipping company Jugoslavenska Linijska Plovidba until 1949 when the steamer burned while in drydock and was declared a total loss.

Design and Construction
Early in 1925 Clyde Steamship Co. inaugurated an ambitious shipbuilding program designed to augment their cargo and passenger carrying capabilities between New York, Carolinas and Florida. Four vessels of the program were similar to Mohawk, but the last two, future SS Iroquois and SS Shawnee, were bigger and more luxurious passenger liners. The contract for all these vessels was awarded to the Newport News Ship Building & Drydock Co. and Shawnee was laid down at the shipbuilder's yard in Newport News (yard number 307) on 15 May 1926 and launched on 18 April 1927, with Miss Eleanor Hoyt of New York, serving as the sponsor. The ship was primarily designed for passenger transportation and was built for speed being able to cover the distance between New York and Jacksonville in less than two days. The steamship had four passenger decks, with two of them being designed as glass-enclosed promenades. The vessel provided accommodations in single cabins and suites for 723 passengers, all of them being provided with private baths, running hot and cold water and electrical lights, with interior decorations designed and created by a nationally renowned interior designer Herbert R. Stone. An observatory and a library on the upper deck, a tea room, a dancing deck, a smoking lounge and a barber shop in addition to a spacious dining hall able to sit 250 people at once were also constructed to provide entertainment for the would be passengers. Shawnee had electric lights in suites and along the decks and was also equipped with wireless. The steamer had freight decks separated into ventilated watertight and fire-proof compartments, some of them chilled with refrigerating machinery for safe transportation of fruits and vegetables from southern states. Ample space was also specially designed and reserved for transportation of automobiles to ensure passengers could bring their autos with them. The liner was equipped with oil-burning machinery, and fuel and storage tanks of 7,920 barrels capacity.

Following an inspection, the steamer was transferred to her owners on July 21 and departed for New York in the evening of the same day.

Operational history

Shawnee and Iroquois operated schedules along the Atlantic coast of North America, from New York visiting as far north as Quebec, Montreal and Halifax with main service south to Florida and Galveston with occasional cruises into the Caribbean. On 13 September 1939 Shawnee, chartered by the government through United States Lines for one round trip voyage from New York to Bordeaux, was one of five ships along with Acadia, Iroquois, Orizaba, and St. John were used to evacuate stranded American citizens from France.

AGWI Lines delivered Shawnee in New Orleans on 18 December 1941 to the War Shipping Administration (WSA) but continued to operate the ship for the Army under a WSA agreement.

U.S. Army Transport
On 20 September 1942 WSA allocated the ship to the United States Army which operated the ship as U.S. Army Transport (USAT) Shawnee under bareboat charter until returned to WSA on 4 March 1946 and control returned to the line on 14 June 1946.

Immediately after delivery in New Orleans the ship was converted for troop transport at Todd-Johnson Shipyards. On conversion Shawnee began transport between New Orleans and the Canal Zone, making four trips, the last one with 594 interned aliens. After a month undergoing repairs the ship began reinforcement in May 1942 of the Caribbean bases at San Juan, Jamaica, Trinidad and Panama. The next operation was from New Orleans to Panama, Arica and Callao. After passing through Panama the ship went to New York where the Army took over full operation on 20 September 1942 under a bareboat charter from WSA to formally become USAT Shawnee.

The ship underwent a major repairs until leaving in January 1943 for Oran which had been taken as an Allied port during the North African landings in November. With a return to Boston and then operating out of New York Shawnee operated in the North Atlantic to British ports and North Africa until early 1944.

After a stop in New Orleans the ship transited to the Pacific and ports in the South Pacific and Southwest Pacific (SWPA) areas of operations until return to San Francisco, the major Army Port of Embarkation for the Pacific in April. From there the ship made one trip to New Guinea with a return for repairs and then a round trip between Seattle and Honolulu. In July 1944 Shawnee went back to SWPA and became a part of the command's permanent local fleet with the SWPA identification number X-127. In SWPA the ship was used for support of operations from Australia into the island campaigns from New Guinea northward. At one point Shawnee was considered for use as an Army Hospital Ship because its passenger configuration had suitable large spaces for hospital operations. There are indications the ship was used locally as an ambulance transport, a troop transport that carried troops outbound and wounded on return, with one reference citing an official report of a voyage "aboard the Station Hospital USAT Shawnee" though the ship was never formally designated hospital ship by the Army or officially for immunity from attack. The ship visited many of the notable locations of that theater of war including Guadalcanal, though the battles there were over, Bougainville, and Leyte.

In early 1945 the ship was released from the SWPA fleet and was repaired at San Francisco leaving in May for Honolulu. From there the ship operated in the central Pacific with stops at Eniwetok and Ulithi and SWPA areas of Leyte, Manila, and Samar. In December 1945 the ship left from Hawaii for New York where return to WSA and AGWI Lines took place on 4 March 1946. The ship was then laid up in New York.

City of Lisbon (March—September 1947)
The ship was sold by AGWI Lines in 1946, though Maritime Commission records show actual sale on 11 March 1947, to a Panama entity which re-flagged the ship to Panamana under the name City of Lisbon.<ref  Though Panamanian-flagged the ship was owned by a Portuguese company, the Iberian Star Line, and operated out of Portugal. On 28 May 1947 City of Lisbon was damaged in a collision with the cargo ship Virgolin. Though intended for scrapping the owners sold the ship to Yugoslavia.

Partizanka (1947-1950)

In September 1947 the ship was bought by Jugoslavenska Linijska Plovidba and renamed Partizanka and converted at Rijeka to carry about 800 passengers. Portuguese sources note the diplomatic arrangements involved in Yugoslavia's acquisition of the ship.

The ship left Malta on 15 December 1947 for Australia stopping at Fremantle 9 January 1948 and arriving Sydney 15 January with 808 migrants including three babies born on the voyage. Partizanka left Australia bound for the Middle East and then operated out of Rijeka to South America for the remainder of 1948. The ship left Trieste in March 1949 with a second group of migrants of 18 nationalities for Australia arriving 6 April. The next day the ship departed for Split. While in drydock on 12 August 1949 the ship burned and declared a total loss.

Some of the immigrants to Australia were from the program "Employment of Scientific and Technical Enemy Aliens" which was aimed by Australia to recruit Germans.

Footnotes

References

External links
 Photo: Shawnee at launching.
 USAT Shawnee (NavSource Online: Army Ship Photo Archive)

1927 ships
Ships built in Newport News, Virginia
Steamships of the United States
World War II passenger ships of the United States
Transport ships of the United States Army
Ships of Panama
Ships of Yugoslavia